The Cobweb is a 1917 British silent thriller film directed by Cecil M. Hepworth and starring Henry Edwards, Alma Taylor and Stewart Rome. A millionaire mistakenly believes that he has murdered his Mexican wife. It is based on the play The Cobweb by Naunton Davies and Leon M. Lion.

Plot summary

Cast
 Henry Edwards as Stephen Mallard  
 Alma Taylor as Irma Brian  
 Stewart Rome as Merton Forsdyke  
 Violet Hopson as Dolorosa  
 Marguerite Blanche as Miss Debb  
 Lionelle Howard as Poacher  
 John MacAndrews as Inspector Beall  
 Charles Vane as Sir George Gillingham 
 Molly Hamley-Clifford as Mrs. Brian

References

Bibliography
 Palmer, Scott. British Film Actors' Credits, 1895-1987. McFarland, 1988.

External links
 
 

1917 films
1910s thriller films
British thriller films
British silent feature films
1910s English-language films
Films directed by Cecil Hepworth
Films set in England
British films based on plays
British black-and-white films
Hepworth Pictures films
Silent thriller films
1910s British films